Yeruham Zeisel (1909–1987) was the mayor of Haifa from 1975 to 1978.

Yeruham Zeisel was born in 1909 in Tarnov, Galicia, (then Austria-Hungary, today Poland). Zeisel was raised in a Zionist home, and already in his youth was a member of Hashomer Hatzair and a counselor for a group of youths in the "Pioneer" movement. In 1932 he made Aliyah and joined kibbutz Ein HaMifratz. He also worked as a porter in the Post of Haifa, and worked in the digging of fish pools in the area of the swamps of the Ne'eman Valley.

In 1933, Zeisel moved to Haifa, and began work as an electrician for the Israel Electric Corporation. Zeisel was a member of the Haganah, and served as the metalworkers secretary. In 1936, he moved to Kiryat Chaim.

Zeisel was elected to the Haifa city council in 1961, and eight years later, in 1969, he was elected to the position of vice-mayor. Due to the illness of then-mayor Moshe Flimann, Zeisel was appointed substitute mayor. With Flimann's subsequent death, Zeisel remained in office, and served in that capacity until the election of Yosef Almogi in 1974. Almog's term didn't last long: in 1975 he was chosen to be the chairman of the Jewish Agency and the Histadrut. It was then that Zeisel was elected as mayor of Haifa, and he served until 1978. During his time in office, construction of the promenade in Bat Galim began.

In 1979, Zeisel was chosen to serve as the head of the secondary council of Kiriyat Chaim; he held that post until the day he died.

See also
Sarah and Meir Aharoni, The people and the events of Haifa and the surrounding area, 1993

1909 births
1987 deaths
Politicians from Tarnów
20th-century Polish Jews
Deputy Mayors of Haifa
Israeli electricians
People from the Kingdom of Galicia and Lodomeria
Austro-Hungarian Jews
Jews from Galicia (Eastern Europe)
Jewish Israeli politicians
Mayors of Haifa
Polish emigrants to Mandatory Palestine
Hashomer Hatzair members